Salaria pavo, the peacock blenny, is a species of combtooth blenny found in the eastern Atlantic coast from France to Morocco; also in the Mediterranean Sea, Black Sea and the eastern Adriatic Sea. This species has colonised the northern Red Sea by anti-Lessepsian migration through the Suez Canal. The peacock blenny reaches a length of  TL.

References

General references

External links 
 
 

Fish described in 1810
Fish of Africa
Fish of Europe
Fish of the Black Sea
Fish of the Mediterranean Sea
Peacock blenny